Lowell High School was a public high school in the Fullerton Joint Union High School District from September 1961 until June 1980, when it was closed because of declining student enrollment. It was a four-year institution, with students coming primarily from Rancho-Cañada and Starbuck Junior High schools. The school athletic name was the Patriots, and its mascots were known as Johnny Patriot and Janie Patriot.

Campus information 
Lowell High School was located on 16200 E. Amber Valley Drive, Whittier, CA 90604. The site was purchased and now occupied by Southern California University of Health Sciences in 1981. Lowell had a pool, a track, a gymnasium, baseball fields, and a performing arts center. It played its football home games at nearby La Habra High School.

Notable alumni 
 Martin Manley, 1970, US Assistant Secretary of Labor, founder/CEO of Alibris
 Jack Russell, musician, Great White
 Brent Boyd, 1975, football player, Minnesota Vikings
 Dave Leiper 1980 MLB relief pitcher
 Michael Sweet, 1980 lead singer of Stryper
 Scott Thomson. 1972 actor, most notable for Police Academy and Twister.

See also
List of closed secondary schools in California

References

Defunct schools in California
Whittier, California
Educational institutions established in 1961
1961 establishments in California
Educational institutions disestablished in 1980
High schools in Los Angeles County, California
1980 disestablishments in California